Stepan Yakovlevich Kayukov (1 August 1898 – 22 January 1960) was a Soviet and Russian stage and film actor. People's Artist of the RSFSR (1949).

Selected filmography

 Golden Mountains (1931) as worker
 Iudushka Golovlyov (1934) as Ignat
 Do I Love You? (1934) as Mr. Tushkanchik
 The Youth of Maxim (1935) as Dmitri  Savchenko
 Engineer Goff (1935) as Ales
 Dubrovsky (1936) as Colonel (uncredited)
 Late for a Date (1936) as Fyodorov's colleague at the station (uncredited)
 Baltic Deputy (1937) as Metranpazh (uncredited)
 The Return of Maxim (1937)
 Marriage (1937) as Kochkaryov
 Miners (1937) as Loshadov
 Taiga Golden (1937)  as Devil
 Man with a Gun (1938) as Andrei Dimov
 Mask (1938) as Egor Nikolaevich Pyatigorov
 Friends (1939) as Ingush Mussa 
 The Vyborg Side (1939) as Dzhoma
 Tractor Drivers (1939) as Kirill Petrovich
 A Great Life (1939) as Usynin
 Gorky 3: My Universities (1940) as Semenov
 Fighting Film Collection 8 (1942)   (segment 'Night over Belgrade')
 Magic Grain (1942) as Wind
 Alexander Parkhomenko (1942) as Lamychev
 Fighting Film Collection  11 (1942) as old man (segment 'The career of Lt. Gopp')
 The Prince and the Pauper (1942) as Water carrier
 Nasreddin in Bukhara (1943) as Bakhtiyar, vizir
 Ivan Nikulin: Russian Sailor (1945) as Papasha
 Hello Moscow! (1945) as Representative of the factory (uncredited)
 Sinegoria (1946) as King Fanfaron
 A Great Life  2   (1946) as Usynin
 Nasreddin's Adventures (1947) as Bezborodi [Russian prints] (voice)
 Lights over Russia (1947) as Trader
 First-Year Student (1948) as Ivan Sergeyevich 
 Dream of a Cossack (1951) as  Rubstov-Yennitsky
 Sadko (1953) as Neptune
 Did We Meet Somewhere Before (1953) as train station grocery seller
 Maksimka (1953) as Russian ship's officer
 The Wrestler and the Clown (1957) as Vanya, wrestling contest promoter
 New Adventures of Puss in Boots (1958) as Patisone  (voice)
 Pardesi (1957) as  Yevsey Ivanovich 
 Over Tissa (1958) as Dzyuba
 Vasily Surikov (1959) as onlooker in Moscow 
 People on the Bridge (1960) as Ilya Ilyich Khorkov (final film role)

References

External links

1898 births
1960 deaths
20th-century Russian male actors
Actors from Saratov
Honored Artists of the RSFSR
People's Artists of the RSFSR

Recipients of the Order of the Red Banner of Labour
Russian male film actors
Russian male stage actors
Soviet male film actors
Soviet male stage actors
Burials at Vvedenskoye Cemetery